Christian Friedrich Gonne (30 May 1813, Dresden - 30 March 1906, Dresden) was a German genre painter, primarily of historical scenes. He also created portraits and was an occasional author.

Biography 
He was the son of a doctor and initially studied medicine. When he became twenty-one, in 1834, he decided to pursue a career in art and enrolled at the Dresden Academy of Fine Arts. After two years of study, he was awarded first prize for his work. He then went to Posen, where he briefly worked as a teacher. This was followed by study trips to Antwerp, Berlin and Munich, where he participated in an exhibition, then on to Rome. Several of his works were made into engravings.

He went on to create several more altarpieces, but the one he painted for the Heilig-Kreuz-Kirche in Falkenstein was destroyed in 1978 when the Pastor, Rolf Günther, committed suicide by self-immolation.

From 1857 to 1890, he was a professor at the Dresden Academy. From 1875 to 1877, he created a ceiling painting in the vestibule on the south side of the Semperoper, depicting "Poetic Justice: with Heroes from Drama and Opera".

References

Further reading 
 Winfried Müller, Martina Schattkowsky: Zwischen Tradition und Modernität: König Johann von Sachsen 1801-1873 Leipziger Uni-Vlg, 2004, S. 300

External links

1813 births
1906 deaths
19th-century German painters
19th-century German male artists
Religious artists
German portrait painters
Artists from Dresden